The seigneur of Samarès is a noble title in Jersey. "Seigneur" is the French word for "lord". Their traditional home is the Samarès Manor.

Rudolph de St Hilaire (supposedly granted manor by William II of England in 1095)
Pierre de St Hilaire
Guillaume de St Hilaire (c. 1160 – 1218) of Samares
Guillaume de Samarez (c. 1218 – c. 1260)
Guille de Saumarez (c. 1260 – c. 1274)
Pierre de St Hilaire c1274
Pierre de St Hilaire c1309
Guillaume de St Hilaire (c. 1321 – 1331)
Geffrey de Thoresby (1346–1351)
John Mautravers (1351 – c. 1355)
Philip de Barentin (c. 1355 – 1367)
Raoul Lempriere and Guille Payn (1367 – c. 1400)
Philippe Payn (1477 - c1550)
Mabel Payn (c. 1500 – 1565)
Jean Dumaresq ( -1529) Seigneur of Vinchelez de Bas, Jurat and Lieut-Bailiff
Mabel Payn ( -1565)
Jean Dumaresq ( -1537) m Jane Lempriere, d of Thomas, Bailiff
Clement Dumaresq ( -1551) Jurat m Margaret de Carteret d of Helier, Bailiff
Henry Dumaresq ( -1579) Jurat m Mary Lempriere, d of Philip
Esther Dumaresq ( 1597) m John Dumaresq (1548-1606 - see below for descendants)
Collette Dumaresq m John Dumaresq, Bailiff, Seigneur of Vinchelez de Bas (see below)
Richard Dumaresq ( -1556) Seigneur of Vinchelez de Bas, Leoville and Bagot, Jurat m Collette Larbalestier ( -1590), d of Michel, Seigneur of Augres
John Dumaresq, Bailiff 1566-83, 86-87, 91–96 m 1, Collette Dumaresq (see above); 2, Isabel Perrin, d of Edmund, Seigneur of Rozel
John Dumaresq (1548–1606) Jurat m Esther Dumaresq (see above)
Daniel Dumaresq ( -1634) m Catherine de Carteret, d of Peter
Henry Dumaresq ( -1690) m Marguerite Herault, d of Abraham
Philip Dumaresq (–1690)
Abraham Dumaresq m Susan de Carteret ( -1658)
Benjamin Dumaresq (1647- )
Philip Dumaresq (1671–1714) Seigneur of Anneville m Deborah Dumaresq ( -1734)
Deborah Dumaresq, d of Philip (1714–1734) m Philip Dumaresq (1671-1714) Seigneur of Anneville (see above)
John Seale, of London, purchased 27 March 1734
James Seale, 1749, sold to Hammond
Jacques John Hammond (1700-1766), British Consul at Faro, Portugal (son of Nicholas Hamon (1670-1739) of St Helier m Margaret Lempriere, d of Clement of St Helier) m Marie Lempriere ( -1813), d of Jacques and Sara Atkinson
Jacques Hammond (1746–1816) Jurat 1795–1816 m Marie Romeril (1778-1844) of Grouville
Jacques John Hammond (1811–1893) m Anne Elizabeth Amireaux (1813-1887), d of Matthew
Anne Hammond
Emily Hammond m Capt Georges, RN, of Guernsey
Edward Mourant ( -1899) purchased Samares 6 July 1846 m Matilda Le Quesne, d of Nicholas
Edward Lionel Mourant ( -1916)
Claude Le Quesne Mourant ( -1921)
Edward Clarence Davis c1921-1924
Sir James Knott, 1st Baronet 1924-1934 m Margaret Garbutt, m Elizabeth Obbard 
Elizabeth Obbard 1934-1998 (née Gauntlett), widow of Sir James Knott (see above)
Vincent Obbard, son of Elizabeth Obbard

References

Samares
Samares
 
Samares